Ludovico Madruzzo (1532–1600) was an Italian  Roman Catholic cardinal and statesman, the Imperial crown-cardinal and Prince-Bishop of the Bishopric of Trento (involving the secular rule as well as church duties).

Biography
Born in Trento, he was the son of baron Niccolò Madruzzo and Helene of Lanberg, and nephew of Cristoforo Madruzzo, Prince-Bishop of Trento. He studied at the universities of Leuven and Paris.

In 1550 his uncle Cristoforo, named Governor of Milan, entrusted him the administration of the Bishopric of Trento, where the Council of Trent had been in intermittent progress since 1545; it was to continue until 1563. After numerous important diplomatic and political experiences (including the mourning discourse at Charles V's funeral), he was created cardinal in 1561 by Pope Pius IV, given the titular church of San Callisto. Six years later he was appointed titular of the diocese of Trento.

Under agreements between Bernardo Clesio and Cristoforo Madruzzo, the bishopric had gained a substantial independence from the Habsburg-controlled county of Tyrol, and this caused strife between Ludovico and the Austrian archduke (and future emperor) Ferdinand II. The latter invaded Trentine territory in 1567, and Ludovico moved to Rome, waiting for a diplomatic resolution of the conflict. Trento's authority was totally re-established by the Diet of Speyer in 1587.

Ludovico Madruzzo was a friend of St. Charles Borromeo and St. Philip Neri.

He died in Rome in 1600. He was succeeded by his nephew Carlo Gaudenzio.

References

External links
Complete biography 

1532 births
1600 deaths
Ludovico
People from Trento
Prince-Bishops of Trent
16th-century Italian cardinals
Cardinal-bishops of Sabina
Cardinal-bishops of Frascati
16th-century Italian Roman Catholic bishops